Marinirhabdus gelatinilytica is a Gram-negative, aerobic, slightly halophilic, rod-shaped and non-motile bacterium from the genus of Marinirhabdus which has been isolated from the South China Sea.

References

Flavobacteria
Bacteria described in 2016